Simon Peter Poh Hoon Seng (born 15 April 1963) is a Malaysian prelate of the Roman Catholic Church who has been serving as archbishop of the Archdiocese of Kuching since 2017. He served as an auxiliary bishop of the same archdiocese from 2015 to 2017.

Early life and education 
Simon Peter Poh Hoon Seng was born on 15 April 1963, in Sri Aman, Sarawak, to Joseph Poh and Geraldine Poh. The oldest child in the family, he has two sisters, Irene and Doreen, and two brothers, Raymond and Norman. From 1970 to 1975, Poh attended St. Joseph's primary school. He then continued his studies at St. Joseph's Secondary School from 1976 to 1982. He and his family converted to Catholicism between the years 1979 and 1980. After becoming a Catholic, Poh joined the school's club, Young Christian Students, the Legion of Mary, and St. Joseph's Cathedral's altar servers.

Ordination and ministry 
The parish priest of the church Poh attended at the time, Fr. Josef Wassermann, greatly inspired him due to his commitment and dedication. In 1982, Poh decided to enter the seminary at St. Peter's College Major Seminary, Kuching. During his years as a seminarian, he learnt to master and speak few languages of natives such as Bidayuh, and Iban. At the age of 25, Poh was ordained to the priesthood by Archbishop Peter Chung Hoan Ting on 31 July 1988.

In 1996, Poh obtained a Licentiate in Missiology from the Pontifical Urbaniana University in Rome, Italy. He returned back to Kuching and served as parish rector for four years at St. Ann's Church, Kota Padawan. Poh then became the director of the Commission for Vocations and also served as Spiritual Director of the Commission for Youth.

Poh also worked as Chancellor of the archdiocese, Member of the College of Consultors, Professor of Missiology, and Spiritual Director of St. Peter's College Major Seminary. Besides serving as assistant parish rector of St. Joseph's Cathedral, Kuching, he also coordinated the archdiocesan commission on mission and evangelisation. In 2001, he studied Mandarin at Fu Jen Catholic University in Taiwan.

Poh was officially appointed parish rector of the cathedral in 2012. In 2015, he earned a Doctorate in Ministry from the Graduate Theological Foundation in Indiana, United States.

Poh has spent much of his priesthood guiding members of the Church through the youth ministry. He has spent nearly 20 years ministering to youths and is passionate about youth ministry.

Episcopal ministry

Auxiliary bishop of Kuching 
On 9 July 2015, Pope Francis appointed Poh as auxiliary bishop of Kuching and titular bishop of Sfasferia. He received his episcopal consecration on 24 September 2015 from Archbishop John Ha Tiong Hock with Archbishop Peter Chung Hoan Ting and Bishop Julius Dusin Gitom, serving as co-consecrators.

Archbishop of Kuching 
On 5 March 2017, Poh was appointed Archbishop of Kuching by Pope Francis to succeed Archbishop John Ha Tiong Hock who resigned for early retirement. He took canonical possession of the diocese and was installed on 20 March 2017.

Coat of arms

References

External links 

Catholic-Hierarchy.org 
Interview with Archbishop Simon Peter Poh Hoon Seng

1963 births
21st-century Roman Catholic archbishops in Malaysia
Malaysian people of Hakka descent
Malaysian people of Chinese descent
Living people
Bishops appointed by Pope Francis
People from Sarawak
Fu Jen Catholic University alumni